Stachytarpheta svensonii is a species of plant in the family Verbenaceae. It is endemic to Ecuador.  Its natural habitat is subtropical or tropical dry forests.

References

Endemic flora of Ecuador
svensonii
Critically endangered plants
Taxonomy articles created by Polbot